Manuel Angelos Philanthropenos was a Byzantine Greek nobleman who ruled Thessaly from c. 1390 until it was conquered by the Ottoman Turks in 1393, as a Byzantine vassal with the title of Caesar.

Biography
Manuel was either the son or the brother of the Caesar Alexios Angelos Philanthropenos, who had ruled Thessaly since the early 1370s, succeeding him upon his death c. 1389/1390. Like Alexios, he recognized the suzerainty of the Byzantine emperor, and was given the title of Caesar in return. In 1389, he (or Alexios, if he was still living) sent aid to the ruler of Ioannina, Esau de' Buondelmonti against the Albanian tribes of Epirus, and their joint forces scored a major victory over them. In 1393, however, the Ottomans sent a large army which occupied Thessaly. Manuel was thus the last Christian ruler of the entire region until 1878, when it became part of the Kingdom of Greece. Either he or (less likely) Alexios was the grandfather of the Serbian ruler Mihailo Anđelović and the Ottoman Grand Vizier Mahmud Pasha Angelović.

His daughter Anna Philanthropene married Emperor Manuel III of Trebizond.

References

Sources
 
 
 

14th-century Byzantine people
Caesars (Byzantine nobles)
Medieval rulers of Thessaly
Manuel
Manuel